A claw beaker is a name given by archaeologists to a type of drinking vessel often found as a grave good in 6th and 7th century AD Frankish and Anglo-Saxon burials.

Found in northern France, eastern England, Germany and the Low Countries, it is a plain conical beaker with small, claw-like handles or lugs protruding from the sides made from gobs of molten glass applied to the beaker's walls. The main centre of manufacturing was probably in modern-day Germany and the glass was sometimes tinted brown, blue or yellow.  However, many examples in Anglo-Saxon glass seem to have been made in Britain.

External links
 Claw beakers at the British Museum
 A Frankish claw beaker from Germany

Archaeological artefact types
History of glass